Jack Kenny Williams, Ph.D., (1920–1981) was a teacher who became an administrator then eventually president and chancellor of one of the largest university systems in the United States, before returning to the role of teacher.

Early years

Jack K. Williams was born April 5, 1920 in Galax, Virginia where he grew up. He graduated from Galax High School in 1936. He then attended Emory and Henry College, Emory, Virginia graduating in 1940. He began his professional career as a high school teacher and secondary principal in Carroll County, Virginia.

Higher education

Williams' higher education career began with two years as a graduate teaching fellow at Emory University in Atlanta, Georgia. During this time he earned his Masters and Ph.D. degrees. Next came 17 years of teaching and leadership in administration at Clemson University, Clemson, South Carolina. He joined the Clemson faculty following World War II as an instructor. He taught history and government and worked his way up to become graduate dean. In 1960, he was named Clemson's dean of faculty and vice president for academic affairs.

Military service

During World War II, Williams served as an officer with the Fourth Division of the U.S. Marine Corps. He served his country with distinction in the Pacific. He retired from the Marine Corps with a rank of Major.

Texas A&M years

On September 11, 1970, Williams was elected as the 17th President of Texas A&M University.  On May 24, 1977 he was elevated to the position of Chancellor of the entire Texas A&M System. The Texas A&M System is one of the largest university systems in the United States.

He resigned as the Texas A&M chancellor on January 24, 1979 to return to teaching. It was teaching that he loved most. During his career he authored numerous books and related works, several of these are listed in the external links below.

Williams died September 28, 1981 in Houston, Texas and was buried on the Clemson University campus in the Woodland Cemetery. His headstone reads simply “Jack Kenny Williams -- teacher”

References

External links
Books by Jack Kenny Williams
Works by Jack Kenny Williams
Keepers of the Spirit. Texas A&M University. The Centennial Decade--Jack Kenny Williams Era
Jack K. Williams Administration Building, Texas A&M University

1920 births
1981 deaths
Chancellors of Texas A&M University System
Presidents of Texas A&M University
Emory and Henry College alumni
Clemson University faculty
20th-century American academics